Rinse or rinsing may refer to:

Rinse, a step in washing
Rinse cycle of a washing machine 
Rinse cycle of a dishwasher
Rinse, a method of hair coloring
Rinse (album), a 2003 album by Minotaur Shock
Rinse (unreleased album), by Vanessa Carlton
Rinse FM, a London community radio station and an associated record label, Rinse Recordings

See also
 
 Rinse aid
 Mouthwash, or mouth rinse